The Dubai Sevens is played annually as part of the IRB Sevens World Series for international rugby sevens (seven-a-side version of rugby union). The 2007 competition, which took place on November 30 and December 1 at the Dubai Exiles Rugby Ground, was the first Cup trophy in the 2007-08 IRB Sevens World Series.

It was the last Dubai Sevens to be held at the Exiles Ground. Starting in 2008, the tournament moved to The Sevens, a new stadium built to host the 2009 Rugby World Cup Sevens.

The defending series champions New Zealand won the Cup trophy (overall title) over Fiji. Defending Dubai champions South Africa lost in the Cup semifinals. Other trophy winners, in decreasing order of prestige, were Argentina in the Plate, Australia in the Bowl, and Zimbabwe in the Shield.

Teams

Pool stages

Pool A
{| class="wikitable" style="text-align: center;"
|-
!width="200"|Team
!width="40"|Pld
!width="40"|W
!width="40"|D
!width="40"|L
!width="40"|PF
!width="40"|PA
!width="40"|+/-
!width="40"|Pts
|- 
|align=left| 
|3||3||0||0||126||24||102||9
|- 
|align=left| 
|3||2||0||1||49||58||−9||7
|-
|align=left| 
|3||1||0||2||57||38||19||5
|-
|align=left| 
|3||0||0||3||5||117||−112||3
|}

Pool B
{| class="wikitable" style="text-align: center;"
|-
!width="200"|Team
!width="40"|Pld
!width="40"|W
!width="40"|D
!width="40"|L
!width="40"|PF
!width="40"|PA
!width="40"|+/-
!width="40"|Pts
|- 
|align=left| 
|3||3||0||0||111||36||75||9
|- 
|align=left| 
|3||2||0||1||50||50||0||7
|-
|align=left| 
|3||1||0||2||52||86||−34||5
|-
|align=left| 
|3||0||0||3||33||74||−41||3
|}

Pool C
{| class="wikitable" style="text-align: center;"
|-
!width="200"|Team
!width="40"|Pld
!width="40"|W
!width="40"|D
!width="40"|L
!width="40"|PF
!width="40"|PA
!width="40"|+/-
!width="40"|Pts
|- 
|align=left| 
|3||3||0||0||72||33||39||9
|- 
|align=left| 
|3||2||0||1||45||43||2||7
|-
|align=left| 
|3||1||0||2||48||40||8||5
|-
|align=left| 
|3||0||0||3||14||63||−49||3
|}

Pool D
{| class="wikitable" style="text-align: center;"
|-
!width="200"|Team
!width="40"|Pld
!width="40"|W
!width="40"|D
!width="40"|L
!width="40"|PF
!width="40"|PA
!width="40"|+/-
!width="40"|Pts
|- 
|align=left| 
|3||3||0||0||95||15||80||9
|- 
|align=left| 
|3||1||1||1||61||58||3||6
|-
|align=left| 
|3||1||1||1||53||74||−21||6
|-
|align=left| 
|3||0||0||3||31||93||−62||3
|}

Knockout

Shield

Bowl

Plate

Cup

Round 1 table

Notes and references

External links
 Dubai Rugby 7s
 IRB Sevens
 Dubai Sevens on irb.com
 Dubai Sevens Profile on UR7s.com

2007
2007–08 IRB Sevens World Series
2007 in Emirati sport
2007 in Asian rugby union